Martin Rapaport is chairman of the Rapaport Group, founder of the Rapaport Diamond Report and the RapNet online diamond trading network. Rapaport has been called a "maverick" within the diamond industry for standardizing and publishing diamond prices. He has also been criticized for non-transparency in his methodology, as well as his silence over a corruption scandal involving the GIA, with which he has strong ties. Rapoport was an early proponent of the Kimberley Process aimed at limiting the number of "conflict diamonds" in worldwide circulation. 

Each year Rapaport hosts an International Diamond Conference which tackles various topics in the diamond trade world.

Education and early career
Martin Rapaport began his work in diamonds as a cleaver and rough sorter in Antwerp, Belgium. He began brokering rough and polished diamonds in New York City in 1975. In 1978, he created the Rapaport Price List, which has been criticized for not being reflective of true prices. He has since created a number of businesses that bear his name, including the electronic trading network RapNet in 1980 and several diamond-related news sources in print and web formats.

He is a member of several non-profit and diamond-industry-related organizations, including the Jewelers for Children Charity Fund, the Diamond Manufacturers and Importers Association of America and the Jewelers Vigilance Committee.  Following visits to Sierra Leone in the early 2000s, Rapaport advocated more for a Kimberley Process and launched Rapaport Fair Trade.

The price list
Rapaport is a controversial figure according to many in the diamond industry for publishing the Rapaport Diamond Report in the late 1970s, which has become the de facto pricing baseline for wholesale polished diamonds. His proponents claim his guide is the reason diamonds cost significantly less than what they did during the commodities boom of that time.

Activities

Martin Rapaport's impact within the industry is largely controversial because his commercial price guides have made manipulation of prices much more difficult for the diamond industry, and are considered a step toward commoditizing diamonds.  This is an affront to all the industry represents, with efforts to sell diamonds as something as unique as a snowflake, and of eternal value, hence the De Beers' sales pitch A Diamond Is Forever. It is no coincidence either, that Rapaport has largely played a maverick role in issues such as conflict diamonds, synthetic diamonds, diamond treatments, and Fair-Trade diamond issues, or has often been an unlikely ally to NGOs.

The Rapaport Diamond Corporation has been criticized for publishing wholesale price guides for diamonds whilst allegedly simultaneously trading in diamonds directly to consumers (thereby possibly cutting out the wholesalers who subscribe to the Rapaport Diamond Corporation's services).

Pricing

Diamonds as a commodity
Rapaport originally tried in 1982 by filing out a contract proposal to the New York Mercantile Exchange to create a diamond commodity market. The effort failed, he claimed, because the "diamond industry didn't want price transparency."

He is currently writing a new proposal and believes it will only be a matter of time before the idea succeeds, as long as sufficient criteria of standardization are created. Rapaport says diamonds are "definitely a commodity."

You buy and sell them for cash. They're a natural resource with limited supply; they're well defined; they're certified; they're analyzed, graded, tradable around the world. 

Neil D. Reiff writes that Rapaport is "destroying" the diamond industry with trying to commoditize diamonds, and his price guide no longer reflects the wholesale value of diamonds as they are sold, but influences what those prices are before they go to market.  Rapaport counters that diamonds are not unique, as De Beers marketing claims, and are subject to the same laws of supply and demand as anything else. A New York Times report in 2012 cited Rapaport among a list of other major industry players like Edahn Golan and companies like IDEX who are countering the argument that diamonds have too many characteristic differences to be traded in a standardized commodity market.

Price manipulation

Dating back to the genesis of his price guide, Rapaport has been an outspoken critic of De Beers, and what he believes is an effort to manipulate diamond prices. He recently made a reference to the negative unintended consequences of the corporation's practice of trying to control supply of diamonds in the market:

The diamond pipeline is stuffed like a goose and there's some indigestion.

In reference to the possibility large companies might dictate prices in the future, Mr. Rapaport stated:

There are powerful companies involved in diamonds and real concerns about price manipulation, but it is supply and demand that will determine price. If I think the prices on the exchange are not fair, I will walk away from this project.

Diamonds as an investment
Rapaport has spoken at length about diamonds as an investment.  In 2008 while speaking to the Guardian, he cited diamonds' durability even during the 2008 financial crisis because "there is so much new wealth around the globe and wives want in on the action - and if they can't get their hands on big stones, then the price will only go up."  As recently as Summer 2012, he has referred to the investment market as very good because of low prices for the stones and high, rising demand out of emerging markets in China and India.

Rapaport argues that diamonds are indeed a commodity, against detractors who would say each stone has to be evaluated individually based on a list of different factors.

European Commission
Martin Rapaport submitted papers in 2002 and in 2005 criticizing the European Commission's handling of investigations of collusion between De Beers and Russia's state owned diamond cartel, ALROSA. He alleged the European body ignored evidence that ALROSA was selling diamonds to De Beers at prices 8 to 20 percent below market value, and was aiding and abetting unethical and illegal business practices.

Synthetics
This view of diamonds also carries over to the discussion of synthetic diamonds. While he does not believe they will be as valuable as diamonds mined from the earth, he believes that synthetics are yet another commodity that jewelers can sell for whatever value the marketplace deems their worth, but that consumers are always going to want full disclosure that a diamond they are buying is coming from a lab, rather than mined from the ground
The concern in the industry today is what if, just what if there is a way to synthesise diamonds that are non-detectable from natural diamonds? What if technology uses the ability to make this synthetic diamond and no one knows this is synthetic?"

Conflict diamonds
Rapaport has traveled extensively to Sierra Leone, since 2000, long before mainstream media, Hollywood or the diamond industry took an interest in the civil war there, or the role diamonds played in it. NGO Global Witness made Rapaport aware of the situation and invited him to visit. This early trip is featured in the 3 hour Canadian documentary Diamond Road directed by Nisha Pahuja, produced by Kensington Communications (Canada).
After returning, he wrote and published "Guilt Trip" which was quoted in the United States Congressional Record:

Hundreds of millions of dollars of Sierra Leone diamonds are being traded on the world markets without any benefit going to the government or people of Sierra Leone. The real problem facing Sierra Leone is not merely how to share diamond resources among warring factions, but how to stop the illegal diamond industry from stealing the country's resources. But it goes beyond that. The bastards are not just stealing Sierra Leone's diamonds, they are trading them for guns. Guns which are used to kill people to keep the war going ... The real challenge facing Sierra Leone and the world diamond trade, is how to stop this horrific murderous cycle of illegal diamond activity.

Kimberley Process Certification Scheme
Martin is a key member of the Kimberley Process Plenary, the cooperative United Nations / diamond industry partnership to self-regulate the end to conflict diamonds.

Martin has been cited as a technical asset to the process by the South African government, and has advocated the need for better price transparency as a means of keeping the industry honest.

Fair Trade Diamonds

He has long since been an advocate of finding an equitable solution to exploitation of West African labor, and has tried to build mining collectives in Sierra Leone and create a place in the market for what he calls "Fair Trade Diamonds" that would be certified as guilt and exploitation-free.

International Diamond Conference

Rapaport annually addresses ethical dilemmas within the industry at the Rapaport International Diamond Conference, where he invites Non-Governmental organizations such as Global Witness and Amnesty International to meet with diamond industry leaders.

Artisanal diggers
Under his plan, diggers in West Africa will register and be invited to bring diamonds to a public auction. Rapaport says he will pay 5% more than the gems' market value. After independent monitors ensure that diggers are paid about a third of the purchase price, a "development diamond" label will be applied before gems are shipped to jewelers.

Rapaport, in cooperation with the U.S. Agency for International Development and Global Witness invested $60,000 of his own money to create four alluvial mining cooperatives in Sierra Leone, but ultimately sees "Fair-Trade" diamonds as the solutions to West Africa's woes.

Critics

African People's Solidarity Committee
Groups such as the African People's Solidarity Committee, who protested at the 2007 Rapaport International Diamond Conference in New York, say that "all diamonds are blood diamonds" and that Rapaport's efforts to help artisanal miners is nothing more than a public relations ploy:
The African People's Solidarity Committee rejects this public relations ploy. They are calling for nothing less than all of Africa's resources under the control of the African working class itself. Africa is the richest continent on earth. Africans don't need charity; they need control over their own land.

Charles Wyndham
Charles Wyndham, owner of Polished Prices,  Rapaport's main competitor in diamond pricing, is often very critical of Martin Rapaport's prices and personality, often referring to him as "Boney", a comparison to Napoleon Bonaparte. Wyndham refers to Martin Rapaport nearly weekly, and criticizes his diamond prices as being too low, having a flawed or arbitrary methodology or too much like Wyndham's own prices. He has also accused Rapaport of having a monopoly on diamond grading with GIA.

Chaim Even-Zohar
Chaim Even-Zohar, an (now retired) analyst for diamondintelligence.com, a diamond industry news rival to Rapaport's own Rapaport News, is also a frequent critic of Martin Rapaport.  Even-Zohar singled Martin out in his editorial about a corruption scandal within the Gemological Institute of America (GIA), where graders were caught giving a pair of diamond earrings intended for a Saudi royal a higher grade than they warranted.

Even-Zohar made note of Rapaport's silence in the case, noting the close relationship Rapaport has with the laboratory, and the exclusive access his customers (diamond traders who use Rapaport's RAPNET trading platform)  enjoy with the lab as a consequence. Chaim Even-Zohar even went so far as to say that Martin Rapaport's silence about the case was hypocritical, and undermined the credibility of his trade publications, especially in light of him being an outspoken proponent of transparency.

References

Pricescope should not be mentioned as a references-They are biased

Correction regarding "Reference #7" and our article entitled The Rap Trap .  Our article is not "critical" of Martin Rapaport's Diamond Price Report, but rather of the manner in which some retail jewelers use the contents of the report to mislead consumers.

External links

 Link to Diamond Road documentary website

American businesspeople
Belgian Jews
American people of Belgian-Jewish descent
Belgian emigrants to the United States
Diamond dealers
Blood diamonds
Living people
Year of birth missing (living people)